Molvi Ahmed Mallah was born on first February 1877 in village Kundi, Deh Lohan, Badin District. His father's name was Nangio Mallah. He was a moderate Islamic Mullah and had translated Quran in Sindhi in poetic way. Mallah was a folk and national poet of Sindh. He died on 19 July 1969.

Early life
He belonged to a poor family, but quite well-mannered in his attitude, intelligence, behavior, and character. He looked after his herd of animals. Mallah used to sing old songs and tried to fix his own poetry in the melodies.

Education
Molvi Ahmed Mallah received education in a religious school of Hafiz Abdullah Mandhro. To acquire further education, he went to Badin, Bugra Memon, Toha, Sujawal and other cities, from where he received the education of Sindhi, Arabic, Persian, Jurisprudence and Hadith. Finally, he was given a religious degree to impart religious education. His Last teacher was Molana Khair Muhammad Magsi.

Political career
Mallah chose to teach as a profession. When the Khilafat Movement started, he enthusiastically participated in it and delivered very emotional speeches. Believing it to be a threat to the government, he was imprisoned. After being freed from the jail, he started to teach in the religious school Mazhar-ul-Uloom of Pir Ali shah. In 1932, due to the Sunni-Wahabi movement, he bid farewell to the school and purchased his own plot in Badin, where he established his own religious school and appointed renowned religious scholars like Mumtaz Alam, Molvi Gul Muhammad, Molvi Abdul Wahab, and Molvi Abdul Ghafoor. Nowadays, it is known as Muslim School Gharibabad. The adjacent mosque to this religious School gives memories of this great man.

Literary career
Molvi Ahmed Mallah gained a good name in Sindhi poetry and prose, when he actually started writing. His poetic qualities gave him an elevated literary status. He fought against useless dogmas, social evils of society. His poetry is an essential part of Friday discourses in Sindhi mosques.

Publications
Molvi Ahmed Mallah wrote books in poetry and prose. Some of his published works are: Marafatallah (1936), Hakiraee Haq (1951), Fateh Lawari (1958), Bayaz Amed (1964), Pagham Ahmed (1969), Dewan Ahmed (1974) and Israr Ellahi.

He translated Islamic holy book Quran in a poetic way with the title of “Noor ul Qur’an”. He was the first person who translated the complete Quran into Sindhi in a poetic way, which was first published in 1969 by Arbab Allah Jurio. His poetic songs are sung all over Sindh. Radio Pakistan often broadcast his songs in the voice of many different local singers.

Award and recognition
In 1978, Mallah was posthumously awarded Pride of Performance award by the Government of Pakistan in recognition of his literary services.

A school was named after Mallah called 'Molvi Ahmed Mallah School' by the provincial Government of Sindh.

Death
Mallah died on 19 July 1969 at hospital in Badin. He is buried in his native village.

References

1877 births
1969 deaths
Sindhi people
People from Badin District
Sindhi-language writers
Writers from Sindh
Pakistani writers